Simon Wren-Lewis is a British economist. He is a professor of economic policy at the Blavatnik School of Government at Oxford University and a Fellow of Merton College.

Education
Wren-Lewis was educated at Latymer Upper School, Hammersmith; Clare College, Cambridge (MA Economics); and Birkbeck College, London (MSc Economics).

Career
Wren-Lewis worked for Her Majesty's Treasury as a budget-team member from 1974 to 1981. From 1976 to 1980, he worked for the National Income Forecasting Team as a senior economic assistant. From 1986 to 1990, he was a Senior Research Officer and Senior Research Fellow at the National Institute of Economic and Social Research.

From 1990 to 1995, Wren-Lewis was chair in macroeconomic modelling at the University of Strathclyde.

Wren-Lewis is currently an Oxford University professor of economics, teaching undergraduate and Masters of Philosophy (MPhil) students. He conducts research in economic methodology, macroeconomic theory and policy, and international macroeconomics.

On 27 September 2015, it was announced that he had been appointed to the British Labour Party's Economic Advisory Committee, convened by Shadow Chancellor John McDonnell and reporting to Labour Party Leader Jeremy Corbyn.

Wren-Lewis writes a regular blog mainly macro. A common theme on the blog is his concept of "mediamacro", the way the media talks about economics, and how it differs from what academic economist actually think. In particular the need to focus in Government debt as a top priority.

Selected bibliography

References

External links 
 Simon Wren-Lewis personal website
 mainly macro - Simon Wren-Lewis's blog

Year of birth missing (living people)
Place of birth missing (living people)
Academics of the University of Oxford
Alumni of Clare College, Cambridge
British economists
Fellows of Merton College, Oxford
Keynesians
International economists
Living people
Macroeconomists